Paul Taylor may refer to:

Arts and entertainment
 Paul Taylor (choreographer) (1930–2018), US choreographer
 Paul Taylor Dance Company, a contemporary dance company
 Paul Taylor (saxophonist) (born 1960), American smooth jazz saxophonist
 Paul Taylor (keyboardist) (born 1960), American musician with Winger
 Paul Harrison Taylor (born 1957), Israeli sculptor
 Paul Taylor (art critic) (1957–1992), Australian art critic, curator, editor and publisher
 Paul Taylor (DJ) (born 1957), English club DJ
 Paul Taylor (director), director of documentary film We Are Together
 Paul Taylor (comedian) (born 1986), British-Irish comedian

Politics
 J. Paul Taylor (1920–2023), American politician, member of the New Mexico House of Representatives
 Paul D. Taylor (1939–2021), American ambassador
 Paul Frederick Taylor (born 1939), Canadian politician
 Paul M. Taylor (born 1982), Canadian food-security activist and political candidate

Sports
 Paul Taylor (cricketer, born 1939), former English cricketer
 Paul Taylor (cricketer, born 1964), English cricketer
 Paul Taylor (fighter) (born 1979), English mixed martial artist
 Paul Taylor (footballer, born 1949), English football player and manager
 Paul Taylor (footballer, born 1966) (born 1966), Scottish footballer
 Paul Taylor (footballer, born 1987), English footballer who plays as a striker
 Paul Taylor (Gaelic footballer), played for and later managed Sligo
 Paul Taylor (rugby league) (born 1959), Australian rugby league footballer of the 1980s and 1990s
 Paul Taylor (rugby league Cronulla), a first grade CSDRFL player
 Paul Taylor (lawn bowls) (born 1988), Welsh lawn bowler
 Paul Taylor (referee) (born 1959), English football referee
 Paul Taylor III (born 1955), American professional wrestler known as Terry Taylor

Other
 Paul C. Taylor (born 1967), professor of philosophy at Vanderbilt University,  philosopher of race 
 Paul Graham Taylor, emeritus professor of international relations at the London School of Economics and Political Science
 Paul Schuster Taylor (1895–1984), American agricultural economist
 Paul W. Taylor (1923–2015), American environmental philosopher
 Paul Taylor (priest) (born 1953), Archdeacon of Sherborne
 Paul Taylor (engineer), pioneer in development of TTD (telecommunications device for the deaf), a.k.a. TTY
 Paul Taylor, English murderer, see Murder of Anthony Walker

See also 
 Nigel Paul Taylor (born 1956), British botanist